Prófugas del Destino (Running from Destiny) is a Spanish-language telenovela produced by the Mexican television network TV Azteca. The stars and crews are mainly from Mujer Comprada.

Cast

Main cast

Additional cast 

Armando Torrea ... Raúl Caballero
Fernando Ciangherotti ... Mario Fernández
Martin Navarrete... Marcelo Villar
Wendy de los Cobos ... Susana Fernández
Verónica Langer ... Rebeca Acuña
Roxana Chávez ... Sandra Mendoza
Guillermo Quintanilla ... José Maria Mendoza
Erick Chapa ... Pablo
Vanessa Ciangherotti ... Tina Varela
Lila Avilé ... Carla
Roberto Montiel ... Reynoso
Lissete Cuevas ... Matilde
Fidel Garrida ... Padre Jacinto
Gerardo Lama ... Ignacio
Cecilia Romo ... Madre Lourdes
Pascacio Lopez ... Rios
Carlos Torres-Torrija ... Polo
Francisco Porras ... Arevalo
Rodolfo Arias ... Eduardo Mendoza

References

External links
 

2010 telenovelas
2010 Mexican television series debuts
Mexican telenovelas
TV Azteca telenovelas
2011 Mexican television series endings
Mexican television series based on Argentine television series
Spanish-language telenovelas